Back to the Stone Age is a novel by American writer Edgar Rice Burroughs.

Back to the Stone Age may also refer to:

A title from the 1989 album No Anaesthesia! by Finnish thrash metal band Stone
A number-one single in Finland in 1989 by Stone
A title from the 2012 album  Monster by  American hard rock/heavy metal group Kiss
The phrase "bomb them back to the Stone Age", attributed to American general Curtis LeMay